Lina Chawaf is a Syrian journalist. She began working as a director's assistant and then became a director involved in the production of commercials. She founded the Arabesque FM radio station. In 2011, the Syrian government required that radio stations broadcast pro-government messaging in response to the Arab Spring. Chawaf and her children were threatened by authorities after refusing, so she went into self-imposed exile. She traveled to Montreal where she lived for nearly two years before settling in Paris.

Chawaf founded Radio Rozana to broadcast citizen journalism into Syria, with the first broadcast taking place on 26 June 2013. She operates out of an apartment in an undisclosed location in Paris to avoid reprisal from the Syrian government. She returns to Syria every two months. In 2018, she was awarded the Press Freedom Award by Reporters Without Borders.

References 

Living people
Syrian exiles
Syrian journalists
Syrian women journalists
Women radio journalists
Year of birth missing (living people)